Seatrain is the second album by the band Seatrain, recorded in 1970 and adding Peter Rowan on guitar and lead vocals.  The most successful song on this album is "13 Questions", which reached #49 in the Billboard charts. The album is notable for being the first record produced by George Martin after his work with The Beatles as well as marking an early appearance of the Little Feat classic "Willin'" prior to its appearance on that band's debut album.

Reception

Allmusic's brief retrospective review dubbed Seatrain "a great album of East Coast rock and country-soul."

Track listing
 "Willin'" (Lowell George) 3:32 (listed as "I'm Willin'")
 "Book of Job" (Kulberg, Roberts) 6:04
 "Broken Morning" (Kulberg, Roberts) 3:04
 "Home to You" (Rowan) 3:22
 "Out Where the Hills" (Kulberg, Roberts) 5:48
 "Waiting for Elijah" (Rowan) 3:35
 "13 Questions" (Kulberg, Roberts) 2:58
 "Oh My Love" (Rowan) 2:50
 "Sally Goodin'" (Traditional arr. Greene) 2:09
 "Creepin' Midnight" (Gerry Goffin, Carole King) 5:20
 "Orange Blossom Special" (Ervin T. Rouse arr. Greene) 5:07

Charts

Personnel

 Peter Rowan – guitar, lead vocals
 Richard Greene - violin, backing vocals, viola, keyboards
 Lloyd Baskin - keyboards, lead vocals
 Andy Kulberg - bass, backing vocals, flute
 Larry Atamanuik - drums, percussion
 Jim Roberts - lyricist

References

1970 albums
Albums produced by George Martin
Capitol Records albums
One Way Records albums
Seatrain (band) albums